Michael Stone (born February 21, 1991) is an American professional racing cyclist. He rode in the men's team time trial at the 2015 UCI Road World Championships.

References

External links

1991 births
Living people
American male cyclists
Sportspeople from Atlanta